Airfix is a British brand and former manufacturing company which produced injection-moulded plastic scale model kits. In the UK, the name 'Airfix' has become practically synonymous with plastic models of this type, often simply referred to as "an airfix kit" even if made by another manufacturer.

Airfix manufactured a wide range of model products such as cars, aircraft, ships, commercial vehicles, military vehicles, railways, and figures. Founded in 1939, Airfix was owned by Humbrol from 1986 until the latter's financial collapse on 31 August 2006. Since 2007, both Humbrol and Airfix have been owned by Hornby.

History 
Airfix was founded in 1939 by a Hungarian businessman Nicholas Kove, initially to manufacture inflatable rubber toys. The brand name was selected to be the first alphabetically in trade directories. In 1947, Airfix introduced injection moulding, initially producing pocket combs. In 1949, the company was commissioned to create a promotional model of a Ferguson TE20 tractor, moulded in cellulose acetate plastic and hand-assembled for distribution to Ferguson sales representatives. To increase sales and lower production costs, the model was sold in kit form by Woolworth's retail stores.

In 1954, Woolworth's buyer Jim Russon suggested that Airfix produce a model kit of Sir Francis Drake's Golden Hind, then being sold in North America as a 'ship-in-a-bottle', made in the more stable polystyrene. To meet Woolworth's retail price of two shillings, Airfix packaged the product in a plastic bag with a paper header that had the assembly instructions on the reverse. Its huge success led the company to produce new kit designs. The first aircraft kit was released in 1955, a model of the Supermarine Spitfire Mk I, followed by the Spitfire Mk IX in 1958, in  scale, developed by James Hay Stevens. This was a scaled-down copy of the Aurora  Supermarine Spitfire kit. Kove initially refused to believe the product would sell and threatened to charge the cost of tooling-up to the designers.

Expansion 

During the 1960s and 1970s, the company expanded as the hobby grew. The growth of the hobby launched a number of competitors such as Matchbox and introduced new manufacturers from Japan and the US to the UK. During this period the Humbrol company also grew, supplying paints, brushes, glue and other accessories as an alternative to Airfix's own range. Airfix also launched a monthly modelling magazine, Airfix Magazine, produced by a variety of publishers from June 1960 to October 1993. During the 1970s, an Airfix Magazine Annual was also produced; and Airfix books on classic aircraft, classic ships and modelling techniques were published by Patrick Stephens Ltd.

In 1963, the Airfix slot car racing system was introduced. Airfix produced cars with front-wheel Ackermann steering and, later, conversion kits so that normal Airfix  kit cars such as the Ford Zodiac and the Sunbeam Rapier could be raced. The first set had Ferrari and Cooper cars and an 11-foot figure-of-eight track: it cost £4/19/11d. Always in the shadow of the Scalextric range, the Airfix version attempted to progress with the higher-end Model Road Racing Company (MRRC) range but eventually the venture was abandoned.

In late 1962, the acquisition of the intellectual property and 35 moulds of Rosebud Kitmaster gave Airfix its first models of railway locomotives in OO and HO scales and its first motorcycle kit; the Ariel Arrow in  scale. The '60's also saw the introduction of an extremely popular line of boxed  scale military figures.

In the mid-1970s, larger scales were introduced, including detailed -scale models of the Spitfire, Messerschmitt Bf 109, Hawker Hurricane and Harrier "jump-jet". The mid-1970s were a peak time for Airfix. Releasing as many as 17 new kits a year, Airfix commanded 75% of the UK market with 20 million kits per annum. Series 20 was limited for several years to the 1972  scale kit of the 1930 Supercharged Bentley 4½ Litre car, with 272 parts and the option of a 3-volt motor. In 1979 four motorcycles in  scale were added to this series. The company also introduced an addition to the very popular plastic soldier boxed set line with a  scale version.

In this period, apart from model kits, Airfix also produced a wide range of toys, games, dolls and art & craft products. It was still producing other plastic products such as homewares at this time. Airfix Industries acquired part of the failing Lines Brothers' huge Tri-ang toy business, then in voluntary liquidation, giving it the Meccano and Dinky Toys businesses in 1971. This made Airfix the UK's largest toy company.

Decline, purchase by Humbrol 
In the 1980s, Airfix Industries group was under financial pressure, there were losses in Airfix's other toy businesses and attempts to reduce costs were met with industrial action. The financial interdependency of the divisions of Airfix Industries forced it to declare bankruptcy in 1981. The company was bought by General Mills (owner of US automobile kit-maker MPC) through its UK Palitoy subsidiary, the kit moulds being quickly shipped to its factory in Calais, France. Later, Airfix aircraft kits were marketed in the United States under the MPC label and some MPC kits were sold in the UK under the Airfix name (an example being the  scale vintage Stutz Bearcat kit originally produced as a tie-in to the Bearcats! television series). Airfix released MPC kits based on the Star Wars film series.

Airfix's market share reduced to 40% of the UK market (2.3 million kits) though it had 75% of the German market. In the US, where automobile kits were more popular than aircraft, it was less than 2%.

Four years later, General Mills withdrew from the toy market to focus on its core food manufacturing business. At one point, it looked as if the Airfix range might be discontinued but eventually, in 1986, it was bought by the Hobby Products Group of Borden, Inc., which had tried to buy the range in 1981. Borden was also the owner of Humbrol. The moulds remained in France but were relocated to the group's existing kit-manufacturer, Trun-based Heller SA. This was a logical acquisition since Humbrol's paints and adhesives could be used to complete Airfix kits and the Heller factory was under-utilised.

The Hobby Products Group was sold to an Irish investment company, Allen & McGuire, in 1994 and continued under the Humbrol name.

50th anniversary 
In 2003, Airfix celebrated the "50th" anniversary of its first aircraft kit, the Supermarine Spitfire. The celebration was two years early because of an incorrect 1953 date commonly accepted at the time. As the moulds for the original kit were long gone, Airfix reissued its  Supermarine Spitfire Mk.Ιa kit in blue plastic. The kit also included a large Series 5 stand (the moulds for the smaller Series 1 stand having been lost) and a copy of the original plastic bag packaging with paper header.

Demise of Humbrol and acquisition by Hornby 

On 31 August 2006, parent company Humbrol went into administration, 31 of 41 employees being made redundant, largely because of the collapse of Heller SA, which still manufactured most of Airfix's kits. On 10 November 2006, Hornby Hobbies Ltd. announced it was to acquire Airfix and other assets of Humbrol for £2.6 million, and relaunched the brands the following year. In 2008, Airfix's former factory in Kingston upon Hull was demolished.

Hornby era 
Under the management of Hornby, Airfix was revitalised. Old ranges were re-issued, and Airfix launched several new kits annually. Manufacture is in India, while design and packing is in the UK.

Ownership and production summary

Model railways 
In 1962 Airfix bought from Rosebud Kitmaster Ltd, its moulds and stock for the Kitmaster railway range. The models were adapted to be compatible with Airfix's rolling stock models produced from 1960 which went with Airfix's trackside accessories of a few years earlier. Only ten of the Kitmaster locomotives were released under Airfix.

From 1975 to 1981 Airfix also manufactured a line of ready-to-run models of British railway stock in OO gauge ( scale). Their details and accuracy were an improvement on rival products from other British manufacturers such as Hornby. The product range expanded rapidly. A model of a Great Western Railway (GWR) 0-4-2 autotank steam locomotive and GWR auto coach are amongst some of the many memorable and important product releases. Airfix also offered an analogue electronics-based multiple train control system (MTC) allowing independent control of locomotives on the same track. Airfix produced a large number of plastic kits for both railway stock and scenic items. Some of these such as the footbridge and engine shed became instantly recognisable to almost every railway modeller in the UK.

The brand label was changed to Great Model Railways (GMR) in 1979, although the Airfix name was still included. However, Airfix left the model railway business in 1981. The models were sold to one of its main competitors Palitoy which produced the Mainline range of products. The former Airfix moulds together with the Palitoy-designed 2P 4-4-0 and Class 56 diesel were later re-sold to Dapol Ltd and then subsequently to Hornby. Dapol provided new chassis for the 14xx and Castle. The remainder of the Mainline Railways had been produced for Palitoy by Kader Industries and ownership of those tools remained with Kader, is later used to form the basis of the Bachmann Branchline models. Dapol continues to produce (but not promote) most of the kits but as the moulds (some now over forty years old) wear out the kits are being discontinued. Hornby continues to make 4 mm/ft scale models from the Airfix mouldings.

A monthly magazine, Model Trains, was published by Airfix from January 1980. The magazine included especially good articles aimed at newcomers to the hobby and also included many articles about modelling US and Continental European railways, as well British prototype railways. The publication of Model Trains continued for some years after Airfix ceased ownership in 1981. A change in the editorial team saw the original Model Trains editorial staff launch a new title as Scale Trains, in April 1982. A slight name change followed in April 1984, as Scale Model Trains following the final issue of Model Trains in December 1983. Scale Model Trains ran until June 1995, when a new publisher was found and the magazine was relaunched in 1995 as Model Trains International, the November/December issue being issue number 1. It continues to be published.

Video game 

In 2000, EON Digital Entertainment released Airfix Dogfighter for Microsoft Windows. The game featured computer representation of Airfix's Second World War-era model aircraft with a total of over 15 playable aircraft, including the German Messerschmitt Me 163 Komet, and the American Grumman F6F Hellcat. The game featured 20 missions, allowing players to play 10 missions as both the Axis and Allies. Players fought their way through the game's 1950s-era house, destroying enemy planes while trying to collect healing glue packets, new model kits, weapons schematics, and paint to customise their aircraft for online battles. Pilots would battle enemy model aircraft as well as U-boats, warships, tanks, flak guns, airships, and fortresses. Players could also design their own fighting emblem, call sign, and even their own battle maps based on the missions in the game. The whole game was an advertising venture, as the paints are Humbrol and the kit upgrades show actual pictures of Airfix packages.

Model kit product ranges 

Model subjects produced by Airfix over the years include:
 Aircraft 1:24, 1:48, 1:72, 1:144 and 1:300 scales, covering aircraft from World War I to the present day. Perhaps the best-known range of Airfix models. Sets of two 1:72 models, usually one Allied and one Axis, have been packaged as "Dogfight Doubles" series.
 Rockets and Spaceships 1:72 and 1:144 scales. A small range from the Lunar Module and Vostok, to the Saturn IB and Saturn V. Also some TV/film science fiction spacecraft, usually in odd scales, such as the Eagle Transporter from Space: 1999, and the Angel Interceptor from Captain Scarlet and the Mysterons.
 Boats 1:72. A small range of World War II boats. (E-Boat, Vosper MTB and RAF Rescue Launch) and recently modern British Severn Class lifeboat
 Famous Warships 1:400, 1:600 and 1:1200 scales. From World War I to modern. 1:1200 covered the ships of the "Bismarck chase"
 Civilian Ships 1:600. A range of 20th Century Liners including Mauretania, Queen Elizabeth, QE2, QM2, Canberra, France and the channel ferry Free Enterprise II
 Classic Historical Ships A number of 15th to 19th-century ships in small scale (about 1:600) and large scale (from 1:96 to 1:180).
 Cars 1:12, 1:24, 1:25, 1:32 and 1:43 scales. The range includes a series of Veteran and Modern cars e.g. 1930 Bentley Blower. TV and film tie-ins included the Monkeemobile and the Toyota 2000GT from the James Bond film You Only Live Twice - Airfix also kitted the Wallis WA-116 autogyro from the same film.
 Motorcycles 1:8, 1:12, 1:16 and 1:24 scales. Includes bikes from the 1960s to present day racing bikes.
 Trains and Trackside Accessories 1:76 scale. Includes a small number of ex-Kitmaster kits. The moulds for these kits were sold to Dapol in the 1980s.

 Military Vehicles 1:32, 1:35, 1:72 and 1:76 scales. Airfix was the first company to release small-scale military vehicles in 1960 with the 1:72 Bristol Bloodhound with Launcher, SWB Landrover and trailer. The original range of vehicles was in 1:76 scale, also known as OO scale. Also, a range of Military Vehicles sets was produced, such as the "RAF Refuelling Set", the "RAF Recovery Vehicle Set", and the "Airfield Fire Rescue Set" with accessories that could be used in dioramas.
 Diorama sets HO/OO scale World War II scenes including the "Battlefront History" series, consisting of a number of OO/HO vehicle or 1/72 aircraft kits and sets of OO/HO wargaming figures, presented on a vacuum-formed base. Also the "Rampaging Scorpion" and "Colossal Mantis" science fiction dioramas, which were re-boxed MPC kits. A new series of Airfield Sets has recently been released, with Aircraft, Military Vehicles and Figures included in the box.
 Figures 1:76, 1:72 and 1:32 scales. Sets of mostly military figures (approximately 14 to 30 per box for 1:32, 30 to 50 per box for 1:72), of subjects such as World War I, World War II and Modern Infantry, Waterloo, Arab Tribesmen, etc. These are made of polythene, a soft durable plastic. Some vehicles of simpler casting and detail than their polystyrene equivalents and buildings were also available and included in larger playsets, e.g., the Coastal Defence Assault Set which included polythene tanks and infantry for either side plus a polystyrene Coastal Defence Fort kit. Collectors of vintage toy soldiers have reported brittling and disintegration of Airfix  scale plastic figures, though not as an age-related effect
 Multipose Figures 1:32 scale. A small range of World War II figures in polystyrene that could be assembled in different poses.
 Collector Series 54 mm. These were plastic kits of single foot and mounted figures from the Battle of Waterloo, War of American Independence, and English Civil War. 
 Historical Figures 1:12 scale. Famous figures from history, mostly from England, e.g., Elizabeth I, Anne Boleyn, Edward, the Black Prince, Henry VIII, Julius Caesar, and Oliver Cromwell. Also produced were a Bengal Lancer, a showjumper with horse (rumoured to have been based on the young Princess Anne), a 1:6 scale human skeleton, and a James Bond and Oddjob paired kit.
 Wildlife Series 1:1 scale. Models of British garden birds in a diorama form, e.g., two bullfinches on a branch.
 Dinosaurs A small range of kits of pre-historic dinosaurs, e.g., Tyrannosaurus Rex.
 Museum Series A small range of motorised engines. Includes a Beam Engine, Paddle Engine, 1804 Trevithick Locomotive and Four Stroke Cycle Engine. The re-issue of the Beam Engine and Trevithick Locomotive during 2009 omitted the electric motor and gears
 Robogear science fiction wargaming models.
 Doctor Who Models to tie in with the recent Doctor Who TV series including the TARDIS.* 11CAM
 Engineer Models of moving engines with transparent parts to show details.

Airfix also produced a small number of Card Construction kits for use with the Airfix Railway System. These were included with some Airfix GMR Train Sets. And various structures as the "Airfield Control Tower" and the "Pontoon Bridge".

Box art 
Many artists have produced artwork for Airfix kit packaging, most famously Roy Cross.

In popular culture 
The Airfix history has ensured that the company, its products and its brand has entered modern culture, especially in the Anglo-centric world, in its own right. In 2008, a TV advertisement for the Santander bank was produced, featuring a fictitious Lewis Hamilton Formula One car model. Demand for this model was such that Airfix later produced a real model kit using the tooling from a similar Scalextric slot car.

A life-size model of a Spitfire in the style of an Airfix kit was made as part of the BBC TV series James May's Toy Stories in 2009.

In one of the 'Eric and Ernie at Home' Sketches in the 'Morecambe and Wise Show', Eric Morecambe is seen adding the final touches to the Airfix 1/24 Hawker Hurricane

Reference is made to Airfix in the BBC drama Call the Midwife series 3 episode 6 when Timothy Turner asks his step-mother "can I show Colin my Airfix Supermarine Spitfire?"

Airfix kits were extensively used to create futuristic aircraft in the TV series Thunderbirds, the Airfix girder bridge also features in one of the episodes.  A shop existed in the Elstree Borehamwood film studios from which Airfix kit components could be bought in the 1970's.  This meant that space ships from the first Star Wars film (Episode 4, 1976) featured such components in the small Millennium Falcon models used in long shots.  (This information was stated in the 1996 Star Wars exhibition cited in London's Barbican centre).  These may have also been used for the space ship models in Alien (1979) by Ridley Scott.

See also 
 Kitmaster
 Hornby plc 
 Humbrol

References

Notes

Bibliography

External links 

 
 Sticky future for kitmaker Airfix at BBC News, 31 August 2006
 Hornby press release on acquisition

1939 establishments in the United Kingdom
Manufacturing companies established in 1939
Hornby Railways
Model manufacturers of the United Kingdom
Model railroad manufacturers
Slot car brands
Slot car manufacturers
Toy soldier manufacturing companies
Design companies established in 1938